The 1935–36 Coppa Italia was the restarting edition of the tournament and the first led to its conclusion since 1922.

98 teams, all the members of the Higher Directory, took part to this competition, which included a first phase, with elimination rounds reserved to Serie B and C teams, and a final phase, where the 16 winners of the first phase met 16 Serie A teams. All the matches were played in a single leg with eventual replays under the model of the FA Cup, homefields were decided by drawing except for the final match in Genoa.

The trophy was won by Torino, which defeated 5–1 Alessandria in the final match, played at the Marassi Stadium in Genoa on June 11, 1936. Winning the cup, Torino also gained the qualification to the 1936 edition of the Mitropa Cup.

Serie C elimination rounds
All 64 Serie C teams in the 4 Zones (groups) of the championship.

First round

Zone A 

Replay matches

* Pescara (Zone D) withdrew which qualified both Alma Juventus Fano and Mantova for the second round.

Zone B

Zone C

Zone D

Second round

Zone A 

Replay match

Zone B

Zone C

Zone D

Serie B elimination round 

Replay match

Third round
14 Serie B clubs are added (Catania, Hellas Verona, Livorno, Siena, Messina, Novara, Vigevano, Pisa, Pro Vercelli, Modena, SPAL, Taranto, Foggia, Pistoiese) together with qualified L’Aquila and Viareggio.

Replay matches

Knockout stage
All 16 Serie A clubs are added (Torino, Palermo, Sampierdarenese, Ambrosiana-Inter, Brescia, Juventus, Fiorentina, Genova 1893, Alessandria, Lazio, Roma, Napoli, Bari, Triestina, Milan, Bologna).

Legend:

Final

Top goalscorers

Sources 

Almanacco Illustrato del Calcio–La Storia 1898–2004, Panini Edizioni, Modena, September 2005

References

rsssf.com
emeroteca.coni.it

Coppa Italia seasons
Coppa Italia
Italia